Merkinė Manor was a residential manor in Merkinė village, Šalčininkai District Municipality, Lithuania. It was the location of the self-proclaimed Paulava Republic, established by Paweł Ksawery Brzostowski in 1769.

References

Manor houses in Lithuania
Classicism architecture in Lithuania